The World Heavyweight Wrestling Championship was the first recognized professional wrestling world heavyweight championship created in 1905 to identify the best catch as catch can wrestler in the world.

The subsequent legacy of the championship is not linear, with the champion being disputed among various promotions until the formation of the National Wrestling Alliance (NWA) in 1948. The last several reigns are recognized by the NWA under the NWA World Heavyweight Championship's lineage.

The first recognized World Heavyweight Wrestling Champion was George Hackenschmidt, who officially won the championship on May 4, 1905, by defeating Tom Jenkins in New York City. The championship remained active for the next 51 years, with the last recognized reign being disputed between Lou Thesz and Édouard Carpentier after a match between the two ended in a legitimate disqualification.

History 

George Hackenschmidt won a world championship tournament to become the first champion. Hackenschmidt won several other tournaments in Paris, France; Hamburg, Germany; Saint Petersburg, Russia; Elberfeld, Germany; and Berlin, Germany in the same year. He also won the European Greco-Roman Heavyweight Championship title from Tom Cannon on September 4, 1902, in Liverpool, England. He won the recognition of being the World Heavyweight Wrestling Champion on January 30, 1904, in London, England by defeating Ahmed Madrali. Hackenschmidt defeated American Heavyweight Champion Tom Jenkins on May 4, 1905, in New York City to become the recognized world champion in North America.

Frank Gotch won the title from Hackenschmidt on April 3, 1908, and he held the title for five years until his retirement on April 1, 1913. He was the sixth longest reigning world heavyweight champion in history behind Bruno Sammartino, Jim Londos, Lou Thesz,  Verne Gagne (who all held their world titles for over seven years) and Bob Backlund (who held his for nearly six years).

Joe Stecher defeated American Heavyweight Champion Charlie Cutler to become the first widely recognized world heavyweight champion after the retirement of Frank Gotch.

After Joe Stecher lost the title to Johan Olin by countout, Olin started his own line, with both iterations of the title being defended. Ed Lewis defeated Olin while Earl Caddock defeated Stecher. Lewis and Wladek Zbyszko traded the title on multiple occasions between 1917 and 1919, making Zbyszko a three-time unofficial champion and Lewis a two-time unofficial champion, while Caddock debatably held the title for a period of 23 days - 1,027 days, depending on which iteration of the title deemed official. Joe Stecher was able to defeat both Wladek Zbyszko and Ed Lewis to unify both titles in 1920.

On April 15, 1925, Stanislaus Zbyszko defeated previous champion Wayne Munn to win the championship. However, Munn continued to be recognized as the World Heavyweight Champion in Michigan and in Illinois. Ed Lewis defeated Wayne Munn on February 2, 1928, in Michigan City, Indiana for the Michigan/Illinois World Heavyweight Wrestling Championship version. Joe Stetcher then defeated Zbyszko to become widely recognized champion. The dispute ended when Lewis defeated Stetcher on February 21, 1928.

Gus Sonnenburg won the title from Lewis on January 4, 1929, but the recognition of being the world champion by the wrestling section of the National Boxing Association was withdrawn from Sonnenberg for failing to meet real title contenders.

Lewis won the title again on April 13, 1931. Lewis was also AWA World Heavyweight Champion in Boston at the time, but lost that title by disqualification to Henri Deglane on May 4, 1931, in Montreal, Quebec, Canada. However, Lewis was still recognized as the World Heavyweight Wrestling Champion in Illinois. Lewis then defeated Wladek Zbyszko (who was widely considered the World Heavyweight Wrestling Champion) on November 2, 1931, in Chicago, Illinois, ending the dispute. Lewis then continued by winning the New York State Athletic Commission World Heavyweight Championship by defeating Jack Sherry on October 10, 1932, for the vacant title. but lost it to Jim Browning.

Danno O'Mahony won the title from Lewis on July 30, 1935. O'Mahony defeated Londos to win the New York State Athletic Commission world title. O'Mahony also won the AWA world title by defeating Ed Don George on July 30, 1935, in Boston, Massachusetts to become the undisputed World Heavyweight Wrestling Champion. On March 2, 1936, Dick Shikat beat O'Mahony in New York, but the AWA continued to recognize O'Mahony as champion, splintering the "undisputed" nature of the title once again.

Ali Baba won the title on April 25, 1936. Four days later it was announced by The New York Times that Baba would not be recognized as the World Heavyweight Wrestling Champion in New York State by the New York Athletic Commission. However, it was announced that Baba and Shikat would face each other on May 5, 1936, at the Madison Square Garden for the world title. Baba went on to win the bout and thus be recognized as the World Heavyweight Wrestling Champion.

Bronko Nagurski won the title on June 29, 1937. Nagurski was recognized as the undisputed World Heavyweight Wrestling Champion by The Ring magazine.

Londos won the title again on November 18, 1938, and retired as the World Heavyweight Wrestling Champion on January 28, 1946. Londos wrestled his last match on this date by defeating Lord Albert Mills.

Lou Thesz won the title on May 21, 1952. Thesz unified three championships to become the undisputed world heavyweight champion in wrestling: the National Wrestling Association World Heavyweight Championship (which he won on July 20, 1948, by defeating Bill Longson), the National Wrestling Alliance World Championship (which was awarded to him on November 27, 1949) and the Los Angeles version of the world title, Los Angeles Olympic Auditorium World Heavyweight Championship, which he won on May 21, 1952, by defeating Baron Michele Leone).

Whipper Billy Watson won the title on March 15, 1956, by defeating Thesz by countout.

Thesz won the title back from Watson on November 9, 1956. Édouard Carpentier defeated Lou Thesz by disqualification on June 14, 1957, in Chicago, Illinois once Thesz could not continue the match due to a back injury. The NWA rules stated that a title could not change on a disqualification and Carpentier awarded the NWA world title back to Thesz. Carpentier was still recognized as the World Heavyweight Champion in Omaha, Nebraska and in Boston, Massachusetts. He was then later recognized as the World Heavyweight Champion by Worldwide Wrestling Associates in Los Angeles, California. This ended the last time the World Heavyweight Wrestling Championship was unified and to date has never been fully unified again. The Omaha version of the World Heavyweight Championship was later unified with the AWA World Heavyweight Championship. Thesz defeated Carpentier in a rematch by disqualification on July 24, 1957, in Montreal, Quebec, Canada for the title.

The title was unofficially retired on July 24, 1957 and its lineage continued over to the National Wrestling Alliance World Heavyweight Championship.

Reigns 
There were a total of 28 reigns and 3 vacancies. The first recognized World Heavyweight Wrestling Champion was George Hackenschmidt, who officially won the championship on May 4, 1905, by defeating Tom Jenkins in New York City, New York, the championship remained active for the next 51 years with the last recognized reign beginning on November 9, 1956.

Ed Lewis holds the record for most reigns as the World Heavyweight Wrestling Champion with four. Lewis also holds the record for most combined days as champion with 3,073 days, while Jim Londos holds the record for longest reign at 2,628 days. Stanislaus Zbyszko holds the record for shortest reign at 45 days and is also the oldest champion, winning at the age of 46 years, 15 days, while Joe Stecher is the youngest champion, winning at the age of 22 years, 103 days.

The final reign was disputed between Lou Thesz and Edouard Carpentier. All matches were held at house shows.

List of combined reigns (excluding unrecognised)

List of combined reigns (including unrecognised)

Belt designs
The standard Championship belt has three plates on a black leather strap.

Legacy 

Various promotions have been home to world heavyweight championships with origins that can also be traced back to the World Heavyweight Wrestling Championship.

NWA Worlds Heavyweight Championship 

The National Wrestling Alliance Worlds Heavyweight Championship assumed the original world championship's position as the preeminent wrestling championship, and claimed its lineage. Most of the following championships, all based in North America, arose out of the NWA championship. "World" heavyweight championships in Japan, Mexico, and the US Independent circuit  were created ex novo after promotions started.

AWA World Heavyweight Championship 

The AWA World Heavyweight Championship was established in May 1960, after the NWA's Minnesota member territory withdrew from the NWA and established the American Wrestling Association. The first champion was Pat O'Connor, who was recognized upon the AWA's secession from the NWA as O'Connor held the NWA World Heavyweight Championship as well, which he won on January 9, 1959. The creation of the AWA World Heavyweight Championship along with the NWA World Heavyweight Championship would pave the way for the creation of many other world championships in other wrestling promotions. The American Wrestling Association and the title became inactive in 1990 and the organization officially closed down in 1991 with the title also being decommissioned.

WWE Championship 

The WWE Championship's origin can be traced back to the NWA World Heavyweight Championship after an incident in which the Capitol Wrestling Corporation at the time left the NWA to become the World Wide Wrestling Federation (WWWF). This was after the WWWF refused to recognize Lou Thesz as the NWA World Heavyweight Champion after he beat Buddy Rogers in a one fall match – the NWA World Heavyweight Championship title matches usually followed a best-of-three fall format – Vincent J. McMahon, the WWWF's owner created the WWWF World Heavyweight Championship and awarded Rogers the championship belt proclaiming he won it in a (apocryphal) tournament in Brazil. He lost the championship to Bruno Sammartino a month later on May 17, 1963, after suffering a heart attack shortly before the match. To accommodate Rogers' condition, the match was booked to last under a minute. Sammartino would retain the title for seven years, eight months and one day (2,803 days), until losing it to Ivan Koloff, making Sammartino's reign the longest continuous world championship reign in men's wrestling history.

WCW World Heavyweight Championship 

The WCW World Heavyweight Championship's origin is traced back to a match which took place on January 11, 1991, where Ric Flair defeated Sting for the NWA World Heavyweight Championship. When WCW pulled out of the NWA in early 1991, Flair was recognized as the first WCW World Heavyweight Champion. The WCW International World Heavyweight Championship can be traced back to an incident in WCW's final split with the NWA in 1993, when Flair's NWA World Heavyweight Championship reign continued to be recognized as the WCW International World Heavyweight Championship. The two titles were unified in June 1994. The title was briefly defended in WWF following WWF's purchase of WCW in 2001 before being unified into the WWF Championship and retired. Chris Jericho unified the WCW World Heavyweight Championship with the WWF Championship at WWF Vengeance 2001.

ECW World Heavyweight Championship 

The ECW World Heavyweight Championship's origin is attributed to a tournament which was held to crown a new NWA World Heavyweight Champion in 1994 in NWA Eastern Championship Wrestling. On August 27, 1994, Shane Douglas participated and won the tournament and discarded the NWA World Heavyweight Championship proclaiming himself the new Extreme Championship Wrestling World Heavyweight Champion. After this event ECW withdrew from the NWA and renamed itself Extreme Championship Wrestling. The title was decommissioned after ECW's bankruptcy in 2001 and subsequent purchase by WWE, then reactivated and competed for on the ECW brand of WWE from 2006 to 2010 when it was retired for the final time.

WWE's World Heavyweight Championship 

WWE created a new World Heavyweight Championship following its first brand split, when then-WWE "Undisputed" Champion Brock Lesnar became exclusive to the SmackDown brand, refusing to face designated number one contender Triple H, who was a member of the Raw brand. Triple H was awarded the newly established title. This championship was a successor to the WCW World Heavyweight Championship, split via the WWE Championship. It was represented by the same Big Gold Belt once used for the WCW and NWA championships, and was awarded by Raw General Manager Eric Bischoff, the former President of WCW. WWE asserts its legacy extends back to the title created in 1905. Like the original World Heavyweight Wrestling Championship, the title was not prefixed with the name of a promotion, though the physical belt had the WWE logo on it. It would be reunified with the WWE Championship by Randy Orton on December 15, 2013.

Impact World Championship 

The Impact World Championship of Impact Wrestling, formerly Total Nonstop Action Wrestling (TNA), can also be traced back to the World Heavyweight Wrestling Championship. TNA formed in May 2002 and established a partnership with the NWA, allowing TNA control of the NWA World Heavyweight Championship and NWA World Tag Team Championship. On June 19, 2002, TNA crowned the first NWA World Heavyweight Champion under their banner after Ken Shamrock won a Gauntlet for the Gold match at TNA's first weekly pay-per-view. On May 13, 2007, the NWA severed ties with TNA after the then-current NWA World Heavyweight Champion, Christian Cage, refused to defend the NWA World Heavyweight Championship against wrestlers from other NWA territories. A brand new TNA World Heavyweight Championship was first won by Kurt Angle who won it at the 2007 edition of Sacrifice by defeating Cage and Sting. This title however neither claimed lineage to nor was linked to the Original World Heavyweight Championship. The title would go on to be exchanged between multiple wrestlers on TNA and is currently known as the Impact World Championship.

See also 
 American Heavyweight Championship
 Atlantic Athletic Commission World Heavyweight Championship 
 Early wrestling championships
 MWA World Heavyweight Championship (Kansas City version)
 MWA World Heavyweight Championship (Ohio version)
 Women's World Championship

References 

Professional wrestling championships